Anahí Ballent (born 1956) is an Argentine architect whose research focuses on human habitation in Argentina. She is a professor at the National University of Quilmes and has been a full member of CONICET since 1998. She obtained a degree in architecture from the National University of La Plata's Faculty of Architecture and Urban Planning in 1981 and a Ph.D in history from the University of Buenos Aires in 1997.

Ballent is the author of over 30 book chapters and four books.

Career

Citations

Living people
1956 births
People from Tandil
National University of La Plata alumni
University of Buenos Aires alumni
Argentine women architects
Argentine architects